Envirolink may refer to:

EnviroLink Network, a clearinghouse for environmental information on the Internet
Envirolink Northwest, an organisation which exists to support the environmental technologies and services sector in England's Northwest